Ferkingstad Church is a parish church of the Church of Norway in Karmøy Municipality in Rogaland county, Norway. It is located in the village of Ferkingstad on the western side of the island of Karmøy. It is the church for the Ferkingstad parish which is part of the Karmøy prosti (deanery) in the Diocese of Stavanger. The white, wooden church was built in a long church design in 1853 using designs by the architect Hans Linstow. The church seats about 300 people.

History
The earliest existing historical records of the church date back to the year 1620, but it was likely built in the late 1500s. It is possible that there was another  church located at Ferkingstad prior to this one, but there are no existing records to confirm that. The only basis for this conjecture is that the records of the church from the 1600s state that the church inventory was described as old and worn, meaning the inventory for the church may have been reused from a previous church on the site.

The new church was consecrated on 26 July 1854. After the new church was completed, the old church was torn down.

Media gallery

See also
List of churches in Rogaland

References

Karmøy
Churches in Rogaland
Wooden churches in Norway
19th-century Church of Norway church buildings
Churches completed in 1853
16th-century establishments in Norway